A list of golf courses in Sweden by region and district.

As of January 2022, the number of golf clubs organized by the Swedish Golf Federation was 451.

Notable courses

Rankings
Golf Digest has continually ranked Swedish courses since 1993. Svensk Golf, the former monthly publication of the Swedish Golf Federation, in 2020 published an updated ranking using the same methodology.

Visby GC
Bro Hof Slott GC – Stadium Course
Kristianstad GC – Åhus Östra
Ullna GC
Falsterbo GC
Halmstad GC – Norra 
Vallda G&CC
Österåker GC – Öster by Stenson
PGA Sweden National – Links Course
Barsebäck G&CC – Masters Course
Vasatorp GC – Tournament Course
Ljunghusen GC – 1–18
Royal Drottningholm GC
Bro Hof Slott GC – Castle Course
Sand GC

Links courses
Links courses include Falsterbo GC, Flommen GC, Ljunghusen GC, Grönhögen Golf Links and Helsingborg GC – Viken Links.

Tournament courses
Sweden has hosted the Solheim Cup twice, 2003 at Barsebäck G&CC and 2007 at Halmstad GC. 

On the European Tour the Scandinavian Enterprise Open was played 1973–1990, rotating between Royal Drottningholm GC, Bokskogen GC, Vasatorp GC, Linköping GC and Ullna GC. The PLM Open, played 1984–1990, mainly rotated between the links courses Falsterbo GC, Ljunghusen GC and Flommen GC. The Scandinavian Masters has typically been hosted at Barsebäck G&CC, with stints at Kungsängen GC, Forsgården GC and Arlandastad Golf, before a new rota of Bro Hof Slott GC, PGA Sweden National and Hills GC was established in 2010.

Albatross GC, Delsjö GC, Kristianstad GC, Österåker GC and almost a dozen other courses have hosted Ladies European Tour events, such as the Scandinavian TPC hosted by Annika which ran 1996–2008. 

In addition, Swedish courses hosted over a hundred Challenge Tour events 1990–2020, and over 40 International Golf Federation or European Golf Association amateur events starting with the 1962 St Andrews Trophy at Halmstad GC.
 
Key

Courses by region and district

Skåneland

Blekinge

Boa GC – Olofström
Carlskrona GC
Karlshamn GC
Leråkra GC
Nicklastorp GC
Ronneby GC
Sölvesborg GC
Trummenäs GC

Halland

Björnhult GC
Falkenberg GC
Flygstaden GC
Halmstad GC – Tylösand
Harabäcken GC
Haverdal GC
Hofgård GC
Holm GC
Klosterfjorden GC
Laholm GC
Ringenäs GC
Rydö GC
Skogaby GC
Strandtorp GC
Tönnersjö GC
Ullared Flädje GC
Varberg GC
Vinberg GC

Skåne

Abbekås GC
Allerum GC
Araslöv GC
Barsebäck G&CC
Båstad GC
Bedinge GC
Bjäre GC
Björkenäs GC
Bokskogen GC
Bosjökloster GC
Degeberga-Widtsköfle GC
Elisefarm GC
Eslöv GC
Falsterbo GC
Flommen GC
Glumslöv GC
Helsingborg GC
Hinton GC
Hässlegården GC
Höganäs GC
Kävlinge GC
Kristianstad GC – Åhus
Landskrona GC
Ljungbyhed GC
Ljunghusen GC
Lunds Akademiska GC
Lydinge GC
Malmö Burlöv GC
Mölle GC
Naturligtvis G&CC – Assartorp
Oxie GC
Perstorp GC
PGA Sweden National
Romeleåsen GC
Rya GC
St Arild GC
St Ibb GC
Sjöbo GC
Skepparslöv GC
Skyrup GC
Söderåsen GC
Söderslätt GC
Sönnertorp GC
Tegelberga GC
Tomelilla GC
Torekov GC
Trelleborg GC
Vallgården GC – Åkarp
Värpinge GC
Vasatorp GC
Vellinge GC
Wegeholm GC
Wittsjö GC
Woodlands G&CC
Ystad GC
Åkagården GC
Ängelholm GC
Äppelgården GC
Örestad GC
Öresund GC – Häljarp
Österlen GC
Östra Göinge GC

Götaland

Bohuslän & Dalsland

Allmag GC
Brastad GC
Dagsholm GC
Dynekilen GC
Fjällbacka GC
Forsbacka GC
Lyckorna GC
Lysekil Holma GC
Mellerud GC
Mjölkeröd GC
Norra Backa Golf Fjällbacka
Orust GC
Skaftö GC
Sotenäs GC
Stenungsund GC
Strömstad GC
Tjörn GC
Torreby GC
Uddevalla GC

Gotland

Gotska GC
Gumbalde GC
Ljugarn GC
När GC
Slite GC
Visby GC

Göteborg

Albatross GC
Ale GC
Backa Säteri GC
Bollestad GC
Chalmers GC
Delsjö GC
Forsgården GC
Gräppås GC
Gullbringa G&CC
Göteborg GC
Hills GC
Kungsbacka GC
Kungälv-Kode GC
Lerjedalens GC
Lunna Golf
Lycke G&CC – Marstrand
Lysegården GC
Lökeberg GC
Myra GC
Mölndal GC
Partille GC
St Jörgen Park GC
Sisjö GC
Sjögärde GC
Stora Lundby GC
Särö GC
Torrekulla GC
Torslanda GC
Vallda G&CC
Öijared GC

Småland

A6 GC
Alvesta GC
Binga Golf
Byxelkrok GC
Böda Sand GC
Ekerum GC
Eksjö GC
Emmaboda GC
Figeholm G&CC
Glasriket GC – Växjö
Gränna GC
Grönhögen Golf Links
Götaström GC
Hook GC
Isaberg GC
Jönköping GC
Kalmar GC
Lagan GC
Lanna GC
Loftahammar GC
Lysingsbadet GC
Mönsterås GC
Möre GC
Nybro GC
Nässjö GC
Oskarshamn GC
Ramkvilla GC
Reftele GC
Rockatorp GC
Ryfors GC
Sand GC
Saxnäs GC
Skinnarebo G&CC
Tobo GC
Tranås GC
Uppvidinge GC
Vetlanda GC
Vimmerby GC
Visingsö GC
Värnamo GC
Västervik GC
Växjö GC
Wiredaholm GC
Älmhult GC
Öland GC

Västergötland

Alingsås GC
Billingen GC
Borås GC
Bredared GC
Breviken GC
Ekarnas GC
Falköping GC
Herrljunga GC
Hulta-Bollebygd GC
Hökensås GC
Hörlycke GC
Kind GC
Knistad G&CC
Koberg GC
Lidköping GC
Lundsbrunn GC
Läckö GC
Mariestad GC
Mark GC
Onsjö GC
Ribbingsfors GC
Skövde GC
Töreboda GC
Ulricehamn GC
Vara-Bjertorp GC
Vårgårda GC
Åsundsholm GC

Östergötland

Bråvikens GC
Bryttsätter GC
Finspång GC
Flemminge GC
Ingelsta GC
Kinda GC
Landeryd GC
Linköping GC
Mauritzbergs Slott GC
Mjölby GC
Motala GC
Norrköping Söderköping GC
Ombergs GC
Vadstena GC
Vårdsberg GC
Vreta Kloster GC
Waldemarsvik GC
Åtvidaberg GC
Östad GC – Väderstad

Svealand

Dalarna

Avesta GC
Dalsjö GC
Falun-Borlänge GC
Furudals-Bruk GC
Gagnef GC
Hagge GC
Hedemora GC
Idrefjällen GC
Leksand GC
Malungs GC
Mora GC
Rättvik GC
Sälenfjällen GC
Samuelsdal GC
Säters GC
Snöå GC
Tällbergsbyarna GC
Älvdalen GC

Stockholm County

AIK GC
Arninge GC
Björkhagen GC
Björkliden GC
Botkyrka GC
Bro Hof Slott GC
Bro-Bålsta GC
Brollsta GC
Danderyd GC
Djurgården GC
Djursholm GC
Ekholmsnäs GC
Fågelbro G&CC
Fors GC
Grindslanten GC
Grödinge GC
Hagby GC
Haninge GC
HaningeStrand GC
Hässelby GC
Huddinge GC
Husby GC – Österhaninge
Huvudstaden GC
Idrottshögskolan GC
Ingarö GC
Järfälla GC
Jarlabanke GC
Kungsängen GC
Kyssinge GC
Lidingö GC
Lindö GC
Ljusterö GC
Mälarö GC – Skytteholm
Nacka GC
Norråva GC
Nynäshamn GC
Riksten GC
Royal Drottningholm GC
Salem GC
Saltsjöbaden GC
Smådalarö Gård
Sofielund GC
Sollentuna GC
Stockholm GC
Täby GC
Tjusta Golf
Troxhammar GC
Tyresö Golf
Ullna GC
Ulriksdal GC
Vallentuna GC
Viksjö GC
Wäsby GC
Waxholm GC
Wermdö G&CC
Ågesta GC
Åkersberga GC
Österåker GC

Södermanland

Eskilstuna GC
Flen GC
Fogdö GC
Gripsholm GC – Mariefred
Grytsberg GC
Jönåker GC
Kallfors GC
Katrineholm GC
Kiladalen GC
Mälarbaden GC
Nyköping GC
Norrby Golf
Skälby Golf
Strand GC
Strängnäs GC
Sundbyvik GC
Södertälje Park GC
Torshälla GC
Trosa GC
Vidbynäs GC
Viksberg GC
Vingåker GC
Åda G&CC

Uppland

Arlandastad Golf
Bodaholm GC
Burvik GC
Enköping GC
Friibergh GC
Grönlund GC
Hallstavik GC
International GC – Arlanda
Johannesberg GC
Kåbo GC
Olandsbygden GC
Roslagen GC – Norrtälje
Sigtuna GC
Skepptuna GC
Sparren GC – Lisinge
Sundsta GC – Norrtälje
Upsala GC
Väddö GC
Vassunda GC
Wattholma GC
Älvkarleby GC
Örbyhus GC
Öregrund GC

Värmland

Årjäng GC
Arvika GC
Billerud GC
Bryngfjorden GC
Eda GC
Forshaga-Deje GC
Hammarö GC
Karlstad GC
Kil GC
Kristinehamn GC
Lundsberg GC
Saxå GC
Sommarro GC
Sunne GC
Torsby GC
Uddeholm GC

Västmanland

Arboga GC
Fagersta GC
Frösåker GC – Västerås
Fullerö GC
Hälla GC
Köping GC
Orresta GC
Sala-Heby GC
Skerike GC
Strömsholm GC
Surahammar GC
Tortuna GC
Västerås GC
Ängsö GC

Örebro County

Askersund GC
Degerfors GC
Karlskoga GC
Kårsta GC
Kumla GC
Lannalodge GC
Lindesberg GC
Nora GC
Stjernfors GC
Örebro City G&CC

Norrland

Gästrikland & Hälsingland

Alfta-Edsbyn GC
Bollnäs GC
Gävle GC
Hasselabygden GC
Hofors GC
Hudiksvall GC
Högbo GC
Järvsöbaden GC
Ljusdal GC
Mackmyra Golf
SAIK GC
Söderhamn GC
Sörfjärden GC

Jämtland & Härjedalen

Åre GC
Funäsfjällen GC
Hede-Vemdalen GC
Klövsjö-Vemdalen GC
Norderön GC – Njord
Östersund-Frösö GC
Rossön GC
Sandnäset GC
Storsjöbygden GC
Strömsund GC
Sveg GC

Medelpad

Hussborg GC
Öjestrand GC
Sundsvall GC
Timrå GC

Norrbotten & Västerbotten

Arvidsjaur GC
Bjurholm GC
Boden GC
Boliden GC
Granöbygden GC
Gunnarns GC
Gällivare-Malmberget GC
Haparanda GC
Kalix GC
Kiruna GC
Luleå GC
Lycksele GC
Norrmjöle GC
Norsjö GC
Piteå GC
Porjus GC
Robertsfors GC
Skellefteå GC
Tureholms Nya GC
Umeå GC
Umeå Sörfors GC
Åsele Nya GC

Ångermanland

Härnösand GC
Norrfällsviken GC
Sollefteå GC
Veckefjärden GC
Örnsköldsvik GC

Notes

References

External links

Swedish Golf Federation: List of Golf Courses in Sweden 2018

 
Sweden, courses
Golf courses
Golf courses in Sweden